Mr. Brown is the debut solo studio album by American singer and producer Sleepy Brown. It was released on October 3, 2006 via Purple Ribbon Records/Virgin Records. Recording sessions took place at the Dungeon Recording Studios, at Stankonia Recording Studios and at Dirty South Studios in Atlanta, at the Record Plant and at Paper V.U. Studios in Los Angeles, at House of Blues Studio, Encino, at The Studio in Philadelphia, at Presidential Records Studio in Houston, at Glenwood Place Studios in Burbank, and at Le Crib Studios in Westport. Production was handled by Organized Noize, The Neptunes, Carl Mo, Printz Board and Presidential Productions. The album features guest appearances from Outkast, Pharrell Williams and Joi.

Its lead single, "Margarita", peaked at #64 on the Hot R&B/Hip-Hop Songs chart. The song "I Can't Wait" was previously released as a single from the BarberShop 2 soundtrack.

Track listing

Chart history

References

External links

2006 albums
Dungeon Family albums
Albums produced by the Neptunes
Albums produced by Organized Noize